Koko River may refer to:

 Koko River, Rusizi District, a river in the Rusizi District of southwestern Rwanda that is a right-hand tributary of the Ruhwa River
 Koko River, Rutsiro District, a river in the Rutsiro District of western Rwanda that flows into Lake Kivu

See also 
 Koko (disambiguation)